Our Lady of Sorrows Chapel, also called the Chapel of the Blessed Virgin of the Seven Dolors, is a cemetery chapel in La Crosse, Wisconsin, United States. It was added to the National Register of Historic Places in 1986. Additionally, it is a designated Historic Site by the City of La Crosse.

References

Churches on the National Register of Historic Places in Wisconsin
Roman Catholic chapels in the United States
Buildings and structures in La Crosse, Wisconsin
Gothic Revival church buildings in Wisconsin
Roman Catholic churches completed in 1891
National Register of Historic Places in La Crosse County, Wisconsin
19th-century Roman Catholic church buildings in the United States